Courcelles-Epayelles is a commune in the northern French department of Oise.

See also
Communes of the Oise department

References

Communes of Oise